The 1927 Paris–Tours was the 22nd edition of the Paris–Tours cycle race and was held on 1 May 1927. The race started in Paris and finished in Tours. The race was won by Heiri Suter.

General classification

References

1927 in French sport
1927
May 1927 sports events